Pennsylvania is an unincorporated community in Mobile County, Alabama, United States.

References

Unincorporated communities in Mobile County, Alabama
Unincorporated communities in Alabama